Ballarat Province was an electorate of the Victorian Legislative Council 
from 1937 until 2006, located around Ballarat.

Ballarat, along with Doutta Galla, Higinbotham and Monash Provinces was created in the expansion of the Legislative Council in 1937. Ballarat was abolished from the 2006 state election in the wake of the Bracks Labor government's reform of the Legislative Council.

Members

Election results

References

Former electoral provinces of Victoria (Australia)
1937 establishments in Australia
2006 disestablishments in Australia